Cirsosia is a genus of fungi in the Asterinaceae family. The relationship of this taxon to other taxa within the class is unknown (incertae sedis), and it has not yet been placed with certainty into any order.

Species
As accepted by Species Fungorum;

 Cirsosia arecacearum 
 Cirsosia dipterocarpi 
 Cirsosia flabellariae 
 Cirsosia globulifera 
 Cirsosia hopeae 
 Cirsosia hughesii 
 Cirsosia humboldtigena 
 Cirsosia irregularis 
 Cirsosia manaosensis 
 Cirsosia moulmeinensis 
 Cirsosia santiriae 
 Cirsosia splendida 
 Cirsosia transversalis 
 Cirsosia vateriae 

Former species;
 C. moquileae  = Asterolibertia moquileae Asterinaceae
 C. splendida var. laevigata  = Cirsosia splendida

References

External links
Index Fungorum

Asterinaceae